Reinhold Joest (also spelt Reinhold Jöst; born 24 April 1937) is a former German race car driver and current team owner.  During the last 25 years, Joest Racing has won the 24 Hours of Le Mans fifteen times.

Driving career
Joest's driving career began in 1962 in a local hillclimb race in the Odenwald mountains. He had won two German championships in that category by 1967. Since 1966, he raced successfully on the Nürburgring, scoring a class win at the 1000 km Nürburgring. He won the race overall twice, in 1970 and 1980, and a total five class wins.

Joest's first entry in the 24 Hours of Le Mans was in 1968, with a Ford GT40 co-driven by Helmut Kelleners and sponsored by a German car magazine. His first remarkable result came in 1972, after the dominating Porsche 917 and similar cars were not allowed anymore. Without any modern cars available, Joest borrowed an outdated 3.0 L Porsche 908/02 Langheck Coupé from the Jo Siffert Museum. He and his two co-drivers finished third with the 1969 model car. Despite being part of factory Porsche teams on several occasions, he never managed to be in their winning car. He came close in 1980, finishing second together with Jacky Ickx in his privately entered Porsche 936 that was called a "Porsche 908/80" as Porsche did not officially sell the 936.

Despite never winning as a driver at Le Mans, Joest ended his driving career in style. After winning the 24 Hours of Daytona in a Porsche 935 and on the Nürburgring with his Porsche 908/3 Turbo in 1980 (both with Rolf Stommelen), he went on to win several German DRM races in 1981 with a mighty Porsche 935 "Moby Dick".  He retired after winning the Kyalami 9 Hours with Jochen Mass at the end of the year.

Complete 24 Hours of Le Mans results

See also
Joest Racing

External links

Joest Racing official site

1937 births
German racing drivers
24 Hours of Le Mans drivers
Living people
24 Hours of Daytona drivers
World Sportscar Championship drivers

Porsche Motorsports drivers
Team Joest drivers
Sports car racing team owners